Alexis Gonçalves Pereira (born 4 April 1997) is a professional footballer who plays as a forward for Championnat National 2 club GOAL FC. Born in France, he plays for the Cape Verde national team.

Club career
On 2 September 2019, Gonçalves signed his first professional contract with Châteauroux. He made his professional debut for Châteauroux in a 1–0 Ligue 2 loss to Lens on 16 September 2019.

On 8 July 2021, it was announced that Gonçalves had signed a one-year contract with the option of an additional year with Belgian First Division B club RWDM. On 26 January 2022, Gonçalves was loaned to Francs Borains in the third-tier Belgian National Division 1.

On 15 June 2022, Gonçalves signed for Championnat National 2 club GOAL FC.

International career
Born in France, Gonçalves is of Cape Verdean descent. He was called up to the Cape Verde national team for a pair of friendlies in June 2021. He debuted with the Cape Verde national team in a friendly 2–0 loss to Senegal on 8 June 2021.

References

External links
 
 

1997 births
Living people
Footballers from Auvergne-Rhône-Alpes
Cape Verdean footballers
Cape Verde international footballers
French footballers
French sportspeople of Cape Verdean descent
Association football forwards
LB Châteauroux players
SC Toulon players
RWDM47 players
Francs Borains players
GOAL FC players
Ligue 2 players
Championnat National players
Championnat National 2 players
Championnat National 3 players
Challenger Pro League players
Cape Verdean expatriate footballers
Cape Verdean expatriate sportspeople in Belgium
Expatriate footballers in Belgium
People from Nantua
Sportspeople from Ain